Christina Applegate (born November 25, 1971) is an American actress. As a child actress, she gained recognition for starring as Kelly Bundy in the Fox sitcom Married... with Children (1987–1997). Applegate established a successful film and television career in her adult years, winning a Primetime Emmy Award from seven nominations as well as nominations for four Golden Globe Awards and a Tony Award.

Applegate starred in the title role of the NBC sitcom Jesse (1998–2000), which earned her a Golden Globe Award nomination. She received a Primetime Emmy Award for her guest role in the NBC sitcom Friends (2002–2003). For her role in the Broadway revival of Sweet Charity (2005), she earned a nomination for the Tony Award for Best Actress in a Musical. She went on to star in the ABC sitcom Samantha Who? (2007–2009), for which she received two Primetime Emmy Award and Golden Globe Award nominations; the NBC sitcom Up All Night (2011–2012); and the Netflix dark tragicomedy series Dead to Me (2019–2022), which earned her three Primetime Emmy Award nominations and a Golden Globe Award nomination.

Applegate has also had major roles in several films, including Don't Tell Mom the Babysitter's Dead (1991), The Big Hit (1998), The Sweetest Thing (2002), Grand Theft Parsons (2003), Anchorman: The Legend of Ron Burgundy (2004), Hall Pass (2011), Anchorman 2: The Legend Continues (2013), Vacation (2015), Bad Moms (2016), and Crash Pad (2017).

Early and family life
Applegate was born in Hollywood, Los Angeles, California. Her father, Robert William "Bob" Applegate, was a record producer and record company executive; her mother, Nancy Priddy, is a singer and actress. Her parents separated shortly after her birth. She has two half-siblings, Alisa and Kyle, from her father's second marriage. After her divorce, Applegate's mother had a relationship with musician Stephen Stills. As a child, Applegate trained as a dancer in various styles, including jazz and ballet.

Career

1972–1986: Early projects

Applegate made her television debut in 1972 alongside her mother in the soap opera Days of Our Lives and starred in a commercial for Playtex baby bottles at 3 months old. She made her film debut in the 1981 horror film Jaws of Satan (or King Cobra) and appeared in the 1981 movie Beatlemania. She debuted as a young Grace Kelly in the television biopic Grace Kelly (1983) and appeared in her first television series in Showtime's political comedy Washingtoon (1985), in which she played a congressman's daughter.

Applegate was a guest in the series Father Murphy (1981), Charles in Charge (1984–1985), and Silver Spoons (1986). In 1986, she won the role of Robin Kennedy, a policeman's daughter, in the police drama series Heart of the City (1986–1987). For her performance, she received a Young Artist Award. She guest-starred in several television series, including All is Forgiven, Still the Beaver, Amazing Stories, and Family Ties.

1987–2001: Breakthrough and Married... with Children
From 1987 to 1997, Applegate played the ditzy, sexually promiscuous daughter, Kelly Bundy, on Fox's first sitcom, Married... with Children. While working on the series, Applegate was seen in Dance 'til Dawn (1988) and Streets (1990), in which a teenage drug addict is stalked by a psychotic police officer. She guest-starred in 21 Jump Street (1988) and Top of the Heap (1991) and hosted Saturday Night Live (1993) and MADtv (1996). The character of Sue Ellen Crandell in the black comedy feature Don't Tell Mom the Babysitter's Dead (1991) was Applegate's first starring role in a mainstream film, playing a rebellious teenager who is forced to take care of siblings after their summer babysitter dies. She had roles in films such as Vibrations (1995), Across the Moon (1995), Wild Bill (1995), Tim Burton's Mars Attacks! (1996), and Gregg Araki's Nowhere (1997). In 1996, she auditioned for the role of Rose in James Cameron's blockbuster hit Titanic, but lost to Kate Winslet. When Married... with Children was cancelled in 1997, producers pitched a spinoff centered on Kelly Bundy, but Applegate declined.

In 1998, Applegate starred as Claudine Van Doozen in the independent feature Claudine's Return (or Kiss of Fire), appeared in the action-comedy The Big Hit and played the fiancée of a mob boss in the Mafia satire Jane Austen's Mafia.

Applegate was one of the founding members of The Pussycat Dolls, which debuted at Johnny Depp's Viper Room on the Sunset Strip in 1995. She emceed for the group when they moved to The Roxy Theatre in 2002.

In 1998, Applegate began portraying the title role in the NBC sitcom Jesse, which received rave reviews. She won the People's Choice Award for Favorite Female Performer in a New Television Series and the TV Guide Award for Favorite Star of a New Series and was nominated for a Golden Globe Award for Best Actress in a Comedy. The series was cancelled in 2000.

2002–2009: Anchorman, stage, and television
Applegate played the dual role of a 12th-century noblewoman, Princess Rosalind, and her 21st-century descendant, Julia Malfete, in the time-travel comedy Just Visiting (2001). She was Princess Gwendolyn and Kate in the movie Prince Charming (2001). After playing Cameron Diaz's level-headed best friend, Courtney Rockcliffe, in The Sweetest Thing (2002), she appeared in Heroes (2002), the romantic airplane comedy View from the Top (2003), the true-crime film Wonderland (2003) based on the Wonderland murders, and the Gram Parsons biopic Grand Theft Parsons (2003). In 2004, she starred with Ben Affleck in the holiday comedy Surviving Christmas and with Matt Dillon in Employee of the Month. She was the executive producer of Comforters, Miserable (2001).

Applegate guest-starred on Friends in the ninth (2002) and tenth (2003) seasons in episodes titled "The One with Rachel's Other Sister" and "The One Where Rachel's Sister Babysits" as Amy Green, Rachel Green's (Jennifer Aniston) sister. She won the Primetime Emmy Award from two nominations for Outstanding Guest Actress in a Comedy Series for her performance in "The One with Rachel's Other Sister."

Applegate received recognition for her portrayal of anchorwoman Veronica Corningstone in the 2004 comedy films Anchorman: The Legend of Ron Burgundy and Wake Up, Ron Burgundy: The Lost Movie, an alternative film comprising alternate takes and deleted scenes and story elements.

Applegate has performed on stage in The Axeman's Jazz, Nobody Leaves Empty Handed, The Runthrough, and John Cassavetes' The Third Day (co-starring Gena Rowlands). In 2004, she debuted on Broadway as Charity Hope Valentine in a revival of the 1966 musical Sweet Charity. In late April 2005, she took part in the annual Broadway Cares' Easter Bonnet Competition, being sawed in half by a magician in their Clearly Impossible sawing illusion. Sweet Charity ended its Broadway run on December 31, 2005. Applegate won the 2005 Theatre World Award and was nominated for a 2005 Tony Award for Best Actress in a Musical for her role in the musical.

While appearing in Sweet Charity, Applegate broke her foot and it was announced that the musical would close during previews. She persuaded the producers to rescind their decision. Because of her injury, she had to wear special shoes to prevent another accident. In a 2013 interview, she said that because of what happened, she "actually can't dance anymore. And that is sad for me because I always wanted to go back. But I probably won't be able to." She does dance whenever the opportunity presents, but cannot perform in strenuous roles.

In 2006, Applegate appeared in Jessica Simpson's music video for "A Public Affair" with Eva Longoria, Ryan Seacrest, and Christina Milian. She starred in the ABC comedy Samantha Who? from October 15, 2007, until it was cancelled on May 18, 2009; the finale aired on July 23, 2009. The series co-starred Jean Smart, Jennifer Esposito, and Melissa McCarthy and focused on a 30-year-old who, after a hit-and-run accident, develops amnesia and has to rediscover her life, her relationships, and herself. She received two nominations for the Primetime Emmy Award for Outstanding Lead Actress in a Comedy Series and two nominations for the Golden Globe Award for Best Actress – Television Series Musical or Comedy. Shortly after the cancellation was announced, she began a campaign to get the show back into production, which failed. She topped the list of People's Most Beautiful People in 2009. She appeared with her Married With Children brother David Faustino in an episode of Faustino's comedy series Star-ving.

2010–present: Dead to Me and further acclaim

Applegate voiced Catherine the Cat in the three-dimensional talking animal sequel Cats & Dogs: The Revenge of Kitty Galore (2010). She said her mother wanted her to be involved in the film. Prior to Cats & Dogs 2, she voiced Brittany, one of the Chipettes, in Alvin and the Chipmunks: The Squeakquel (2009), Alvin and the Chipmunks: Chipwrecked (2011), and Alvin and the Chipmunks: The Road Chip (2015).

Applegate starred in the NBC sitcom Up All Night with Maya Rudolph and Will Arnett, which debuted on September 14, 2011. On February 8, 2013, she left the series after its second-season hiatus, which was leading into a planned format change. The series was ultimately cancelled.

On July 31, 2013, Applegate was featured on the second episode of the fourth season of the revived American version of the TLC series Who Do You Think You Are?. The episode centered on Applegate trying to find information about her paternal grandmother, Lavina Applegate Walton, who was absent for most of Applegate's father's life and died when he was young. Applegate learned that Walton died in 1955 from tuberculosis and alcohol-related cirrhosis.

In 2013, Applegate reprised her role as Veronica Corningstone in the comedy sequel film Anchorman 2: The Legend Continues. The film received positive reviews from critics and was a box office success. In 2014, she had a starring voice role as Mary Beth in the animated musical fantasy film The Book of Life. In 2015, she starred with Ed Helms in the National Lampoon sequel Vacation, the fifth full-length movie episode of the road-trip comedies. They played Rusty Griswold and his wife, Debbie, who with their two sons take a trip to Walley World, just as Rusty did with his parents in the 1983 original film, National Lampoon's Vacation. The film was poorly reviewed, but was a box office success. In 2016, she starred as Gwendolyn James in the comedy film Bad Moms with Mila Kunis, Kristen Bell, and Kathryn Hahn. The film earned mixed reviews from critics and was a box office success. She reprised her role for a cameo appearance in the November 2017 sequel A Bad Moms Christmas.

In July 2018, Applegate co-starred with Linda Cardellini in the Netflix dark comedy series Dead to Me and executive produced the series with Will Ferrell, Adam McKay, and Jessica Elbaum. The series received critical acclaim. Applegate received two nominations for the Primetime Emmy Award for Outstanding Lead Actress in a Comedy Series for her performance in seasons one and two and nominations for a Golden Globe Award, Screen Actors Guild Award, and TCA Award.

On November 14, 2022, she received a star on Hollywood Walk of Fame. She was accompanied by her Married With Children co-stars Katey Sagal and David Faustino. Her star was placed adjacent to Sagal and Ed O'Neill's stars.

Personal life
On October 20, 2001, Applegate married actor Johnathon Schaech in Palm Springs, California. Schaech filed for divorce in December 2005, citing irreconcilable differences, and the divorce was finalized in August 2007. In 2009, she began dating Dutch musician Martyn LeNoble. The couple became engaged on Valentine's Day 2010 and married on February 23, 2013, at their Los Angeles home. It was the second marriage for both. They have one daughter, born in January 2011. Applegate is a vegetarian, and in 2007 appeared in an anti-fur advertisement for PETA.

Health
In 2008, People reported that Applegate had been diagnosed with breast cancer. A representative stated, "Christina Applegate was diagnosed with an early stage of breast cancer. Detected early through a doctor-ordered MRI, the cancer was not life-threatening. Christina is following the recommended treatment of her doctors and will have a full recovery." It was announced that she was cancer-free after a double mastectomy, although cancer had been found in only one breast. She has an inherited genetic trait, a BRCA1 mutation, which can trigger breast and ovarian cancer. Her mother is also a breast cancer survivor. Applegate said when she first was diagnosed, "I was just shaking and then, also immediately, I had to go into 'take-care-of-business mode,' which included a change to a more healthy diet."

In August 2021, Applegate announced that she had been diagnosed with multiple sclerosis a few months prior. The disease heavily affected her ability to perform on set during the final season of Dead to Me, the success of which she accredits to her co-star Linda Cardellini and showrunner Liz Feldman's support and openness in making reasonable adjustments to her filming schedule.

In a 2023 interview with The Los Angeles Times, Applegate said the upcoming Screen Actors Guild Awards would likely be the last awards show she attended as an actor. She also said that she would probably make money doing voiceover work, and that she was considering producing and development.

Philanthropy
Applegate has supported Entertainment Industry Foundation, Adopt-A-Classroom, The Motion Picture and Television Fund Foundation, World Animal Protection, and the Trevor Project. In 2003, she was the spokesman for the Lee National Denim Day, which raises millions of dollars for breast cancer education and research. Following her breast cancer diagnosis, she appeared on a television special, Stand Up to Cancer, designed to raise funds for breast cancer research. The one-hour special was broadcast on CBS, NBC and ABC television networks on September 5, 2008.

In 2009, Applegate announced plans to return as the ambassador for Lee National Denim Day. Also in 2009, she founded Right Action for Women, a charitable foundation dedicated to breast-cancer screening for women and focused on the type of MRI scan that saved her life. In February 2015, she was awarded the Saint Vintage Love Cures Award at the 2nd annual unite4:humanity event hosted by Variety magazine for her dedication to and work with Right Action for Women.

Acting credits

Film

Television

Theatre

Music videos

Awards and nominations

References

Further reading
 Dye, David. Child and Youth Actors: Filmography of Their Entire Careers, 1914–1985. Jefferson, NC: McFarland & Co., 1988, p. 6.

External links

 
 
 
 

1971 births
Living people
20th-century American actresses
21st-century American actresses
Actresses from Hollywood, Los Angeles
American child actresses
American female dancers
American film actresses
American musical theatre actresses
American neo-burlesque performers
American philanthropists
American stage actresses
American television actresses
American voice actresses
Dancers from California
Drama Desk Award winners
People with multiple sclerosis
Primetime Emmy Award winners
Theatre World Award winners